Narahia is a large village in Madhubani district of the Indian state of Bihar.  Narahia is also called for the Mithalanchal land of Bihar.

Geography
Narahia is located in north Bihar, near the border of India and Nepal (about 30 km by road). It is surrounded by Balan and Bihul rivers. Narahia is located in Laukahi Block of Madhubani district. 

It is alongside the East-west corridor (Porbander to Silcher NH 57).

Demographics 
2762 families residing there. Its population includes 13740 of which 7019 are males while 6721 are females as per Population Census 2011.

In Narahia village population of children age 0-6 is 2646 which makes up 19.26% of the population. The average sex ratio of Narahia village is 958 which is higher than Bihar state average of 918. The child sex ratio as per census is 938 was higher than Bihar average of 935.

Narahia village has lower literacy rate compared to Bihar. In 2011, the literacy rate was 53.17% compared to 61.80% for Bihar. Male literacy stands at 64.33% while female literacy rate was 41.58%.

Administration 
This village comes under Laukahi police station, and Laukha laukahi Vidhan sabha kshetra, and Phulparas constituency.

Education 
SSP High School is located there

Economy 
Narahia supports a business hub.

Narahia hosts a branch of Uttar Bihar Gramin Bank IFSC code- CBIN0R10001. It has two ATMs.

Transport 
National Highway 57 and National Highway 104 pass through Narahia. The closest railway station is Nirmali and Ghoghardiha.

The nearest airport is Patna Airport some 200 km away. Darbhanga Airport is about to open for civil flights. It is around 80km m away.

References

External links
 About Narahia
 Satellite map of Narahia

Cities and towns in Madhubani district